Where the Toys Come From is a Disney special directed by Theodore Thomas and aired as part of Disney Studio Showcase series of specials on Disney Channel on December 3, 1983 and then released on video in November 1984.

Plot
The movie follows the journey of two toys, named Zoom and Peepers, as they try to find out where they were made.  Their owner, named Robin assists them in their journey. Their search begins in a toy museum, where they find out they were made in Japan. Robin takes them to the toy store they were purchased from and they begin their trip to Japan. In Japan, Zoom and Peepers find their maker, named Kenji and their questions are answered. Finally they magically return home, where they tell Robin about how they returned, and ask the new toys to be Robin's.

Cast

References

External links
 Information at Disney.com
 

1983 films
Disney animated films
Films about dolls
Films about toys
Sentient toys in fiction
American films with live action and animation
Films directed by Theodore Thomas (filmmaker)
Films set in Japan
Japan in non-Japanese culture
1980s English-language films
1980s American films